The Senator John Heinz History Center, an affiliate of the Smithsonian Institution, is the largest history museum in the Commonwealth of Pennsylvania, United States. Named after U.S. Senator H. John Heinz III (1938–1991) from Pennsylvania, it is located in the Strip District of Pittsburgh.

The Heinz History Center is a  educational institution "that engages and inspires a diverse audience with links to the past, understanding in the present, and guidance for the future by preserving regional history and presenting the American experience with a Western Pennsylvania connection."

Senator John Heinz History Center
The History Center features the Western Pennsylvania Sports Museum and the Library and Archives, and includes six floors of permanent and changing exhibitions that tell the story of Western Pennsylvania. Though it was originally established in 1879, the Historical Society of Western Pennsylvania opened its current location in the historic Strip District along the Allegheny River on April 28, 1996. It is named for H. John Heinz III, the late U.S. Senator from Pennsylvania who died in a 1991 plane crash.

The century-old Chautauqua Lake Ice Company building was renovated and adapted by the Pittsburgh office of the architecture firm of Bohlin Cywinski Jackson, who did the design and oversaw construction. The interior was designed to show off the building's features, as well as create spaces for exhibits and support space. The museum building is an exhibit in its own right. The History Center also features the following permanent exhibitions:

 Pittsburgh: A Tradition of Innovation celebrates 250 years of Western Pennsylvania's significant contributions to the world, from Dr. Jonas Salk's discovery of the polio vaccine to the invention of the Big Mac.
 Senator John Heinz: A Western Pennsylvania Legacy details the life and legacy of one of Pittsburgh's most beloved philanthropists and politicians.
 Pittsburgh's reign as America's "glass city" and the history of the region’s first industry is showcased in Glass: Shattering Notions.
 Heinz chronicles the history of the H.J. Heinz Company.
 The Special Collections Gallery houses more than 3,000 artifacts illustrating the rich ethnic history and corporate fabric of the Pittsburgh region. In 2017, this was the home to a lot of artifacts from Mister Rogers' Neighborhood. Those items are still there today.

The museum's history began in 1879, with the formation of a club called Old Residents of Pittsburgh and Western Pennsylvania. In 1884 it changed its name to the Historical Society of Western Pennsylvania (HSWP) and has been operating continuously since then. It is the Pittsburgh region's oldest cultural organization.

HSWP began the tradition of interpreting public history in 1911, organizing the centennial of steamboat navigation in Pittsburgh. In 1955 it led the organization of the city's bicentennial celebration. In the early years, HSWP held meetings in homes and churches, but in 1893, it was granted a space for its archives at the new Carnegie Library of Pittsburgh in the Oakland neighborhood. By 1914, it had its own building nearby. It operated there until 1996, when its expanded quarters in the renovated historic warehouse were completed in Pittsburgh's Strip District. The Society celebrated the opening of the new museum by an Inaugural Gala there on April 26, 1996, for 900 guests.

Western Pennsylvania Sports Museum at the History Center
Located in the Smithsonian wing of the Senator John Heinz History Center, the Western Pennsylvania Sports Museum spans  of exhibit space over two floors. The "museum within a museum" captures the Pittsburgh region's evolution and influence as a sports leader over more than a century, from amateur to pro and across the spectrum of sports. The Sports Museum captures tales of Pittsburgh sports through hundreds of artifacts, more than 70 hands-on interactive exhibits, and 20 audio-visual programs.

Select artifacts include Franco Harris' "Immaculate Reception" cleats; Mario Lemieux's hockey skates; Satchel Paige's baseball glove; the pitching rubber from the 1960 World Series; Billy Conn's boxing gloves and light heavyweight champion belt; Arnold Palmer's sweater and golf bag; Chip Ganassi's 2000 Indy 500-winning race car; the "Ultimate Steelers Fan's Car;" the Homestead women swimmers Olympic medals from the 1920s and 1930s; and hundreds of Pittsburgh Pirates baseball cards.

Detre Library & Archives at the History Center
The History Center's Detre Library & Archives is an extensive scholarly resource documenting 250 years of life in Western Pennsylvania. The collection includes books, manuscripts, photographs, maps, atlases, newspapers, films, recordings, and other memorabilia.

Meadowcroft Rockshelter and Historic Village
The History Center also operates Meadowcroft Rockshelter, a world-renowned archaeological site south of Pittsburgh near Washington County's Avella community.

The Rockshelter is the oldest site of human habitation in North America, with evidence of man living there for nearly 16,000 years. The site was named a National Historic Landmark in 2005.

Adjacent to the Rockshelter is the historic village. The History Center operates this as a living museum, with re-enactors recreating rural life in the 19th century.

Fort Pitt Museum
Since 2010 the History Center has operated the Fort Pitt Museum, a two-floor,  museum that tells the story of Western Pennsylvania’s pivotal role during the French and Indian War, the American Revolution, and as the birthplace of Pittsburgh.

References

External links
Senator John Heinz History Center
 Life in Western Pennsylvania, contains digitized films and photographs from collections held by the History Center's Library and Archives.

Heinz, John
History centers
History museums in Pennsylvania
Museums in Pittsburgh
Smithsonian Institution affiliates
Sports museums in Pennsylvania
Museums established in 1996
Pittsburgh Labor History